This was the first edition of the tournament.

Ana Bogdan won her first WTA Challenger title, defeating Panna Udvardy in the final, 6–2, 3–6, 6–1.

Seeds

Draw

Finals

Top half

Bottom half

Qualifying

Seeds

Qualifiers

Lucky losers

Draw

First qualifier

Second qualifier

Third qualifier

Fourth qualifier

References

External Links
Main Draw

Iasi Open - Singles